Desino (formerly Τεσινόν - Tesinon) is a mountain village in the municipal unit of Aroania, Achaea, Greece. In 2011, it had a population of 37. The village is situated in the eastern foothills of Mount Erymanthos. The name is a corruption of the word στενό "narrow". Desino is 2 km east of Kamenianoi, 4 km west of Priolithos and 15 km southwest of Kalavryta.

Population

See also
List of settlements in Achaea

References

External links
Desino at the GTP Travel Pages

Aroania
Populated places in Achaea